Gunhild Hoffmeister (born 6 July 1944) is a retired East German middle-distance runner. She competed at the 1972 and 1976 Olympics and won two silver and one bronze medal, becoming the only German distance runner to win three Olympic medals. Together with Hans Grodotzki she is the only German runner to win two medals at the same Olympics. Her personal best time in 1500 metres was 4:01.4, achieved in July 1976 in Potsdam. This places her ninth on the German all-time list.

At the European Championships Hoffmeister won five medals between 1971 and 1974: three outdoors and two indoors. She also won the European Cup in 1973 and placed second in 1970. Domestically she collected 15 outdoor and two indoor East German titles. She set three world records: in the 1000 m in 1972 and in the 4×800 m relay in 1969 and 1976.

Hoffmeister was a sports teacher by training and after retiring from competitions became deputy chief of the Children and Youth School in Cottbus. She was also active in politics and was a member of East German Parliament in 1971–76. Until the German reunification in 1990 she served as a board member of the East German Sports Federation, and after that worked as a sports rehabilitation therapist in Berlin. Her daughter Kerstin also became a competitive runner.

References

External links

 
 
 

1944 births
Living people
Sportspeople from Forst (Lausitz)
People from the Province of Brandenburg
Free German Youth members
Members of the 6th Volkskammer
Female members of the Volkskammer
German sportsperson-politicians
East German female middle-distance runners
Olympic athletes of East Germany
Athletes (track and field) at the 1972 Summer Olympics
Athletes (track and field) at the 1976 Summer Olympics
Olympic silver medalists for East Germany
Olympic bronze medalists for East Germany
European Athletics Championships medalists
Medalists at the 1972 Summer Olympics
Medalists at the 1976 Summer Olympics
Olympic silver medalists in athletics (track and field)
Olympic bronze medalists in athletics (track and field)
Universiade medalists in athletics (track and field)
Recipients of the Patriotic Order of Merit in gold
Universiade gold medalists for East Germany
Medalists at the 1970 Summer Universiade